Toodyay railway station is located on the Eastern Railway in the Avon River town of Toodyay in Western Australia.

History
There have been three stopping places for railway passengers in Toodyay.

As was the case with other communities in Western Australia at the time, railway routes through established localities caused concern to the residents when the railway lines were in planning stages.

Original stopping point

The original railway stopping point on the narrow gauge Clackline–Miling line was where a railway platform is indicated on the north side of the track on the Public Works Department plan for that time.

Original station
The locality at that time was known as Newcastle; by 1897 the station building was constructed within a short distance west of the original terminus, and was referred to regularly in advertising as being across the road from the Newcastle Hotel.

On 6 May 1910, Newcastle was regazetted as Toodyay with the station likewise renamed. The line was extended west, then over the Avon River, and then north in stages, reaching Miling in August 1925.

Current station
Although the route was surveyed in the 1940s, it wasn't until the passing of the Railways (Standard Gauge) Construction Act 1961 that construction commenced on the dual gauge Eastern Railway through the Avon Valley.

As part of the construction of the new line, Toodyay was provided with a station on the new alignment, opening on 14 February 1966 with the narrow gauge line through Toodyay closed and later removed. The new dual gauge line passed through the town of Toodyay with a new station built west of the earlier stations.

The Clackline-Miling narrow gauge line branches off the Eastern Railway at West Toodyay, a former marshalling yard, three kilometres west of Toodyay.

Passenger services
Transwa's AvonLink, MerredinLink and Prospector services stop at Toodyay, at least one service each day.

Notes

References

External links

History of Western Australian Railways & Stations gallery

Eastern Railway (Western Australia)
Railway stations in Western Australia
Railway stations in Australia opened in 1966
Toodyay, Western Australia
Railway stations in Australia opened in 1897